Tried + True is the third and final studio album by Tinfed, released on August 22, 2000 by Hollywood Records. It was produced by Ed Buller, known for his work with English groups such as Suede, Spiritualized and Slowdive. The song "Dangergirl" features a guest appearance by Chino Moreno, lead vocalist of Deftones. The album also contains "Immune", which was featured in the 2000 film Mission: Impossible 2 and appeared on its soundtrack.

Reception
Stanton Swihart of allmusic gave the album a mixed review and criticized the band for sounding too derivative of Britpop groups such as Radiohead and Travis, saying "they ultimately fail to attain the same levels of esoteric complexity as those bands." Swihart concluded his review saying the band's best material may be ahead of them: "While Tinfed is not unequivocally successful or innovative on a sonic level, it is frequently exciting and a terribly promising effort from a band that may eventually cast its own considerable shadow." CMJ reviewed it more positively, calling Tried + True a "forward-thinking rock record with plenty of potential commercial appeal" that "contains pretty guitar pop enhanced only minimally by studio machinery."

Track listing

Personnel 
Adapted from the Tried + True liner notes.

Tinfed
 Matt McCord – drums, percussion
 Rey Osburn – lead vocals, electric guitar, electronics
 Eric Stenman – electric guitar, bass guitar
 Rick Verrett – bass guitar

Additional musicians
 Chino Moreno – vocals (11)

Production
 Ed Buller – production, engineering, mixing
 Enrique Gonzalez Muller – engineering

Release history

References

External links 
 

2000 albums
Tinfed albums
Hollywood Records albums